Môlča is a village and municipality in Banská Bystrica District in the Banská Bystrica Region of central Slovakia.

History
In historical records the village was first mentioned in 1293.

Geography
The municipality lies at an altitude of 478 metres and covers an area of 9.393 km2. It has a population of about 358 people.

References

External links
 http://www.molca.sk

Villages and municipalities in Banská Bystrica District